Princess Helena of Waldeck and Pyrmont (22 December 189918 February 1948) was the only daughter of Friedrich, Prince of Waldeck and Pyrmont, last reigning Prince of Waldeck and Pyrmont, and wife of Nikolaus, Hereditary Grand Duke of Oldenburg.

Early life

Helena was born at Arolsen, Waldeck and Pyrmont the third child and first and only daughter of Friedrich, Prince of Waldeck and Pyrmont (1865–1946), and his wife, Princess Bathildis of Schaumburg-Lippe (1873–1962), daughter of Wilhelm Karl August, Prince of Schaumburg-Lippe. 

She was a first cousin of Queen Wilhelmina of the Netherlands. She was named after her paternal aunt Princess Helena, Duchess of Albany (1861–1922) who married Prince Leopold, Duke of Albany, youngest son of Queen Victoria.

Marriage and family
Helena married on 26 October 1921 in Arolsen, Nikolaus, Hereditary Grand Duke of Oldenburg (1897–1970), third child and first son of Frederick Augustus II, Grand Duke of Oldenburg and Duchess Elisabeth Alexandrine of Mecklenburg-Schwerin.

They had nine children:
Anton-Günther, Duke of Oldenburg (16 January 1923 – 20 September 2014); married Princess Ameli of Löwenstein-Wertheim-Freudenberg, had issue
Duchess Rixa of Oldenburg (28 March 1924 – 1 April 1939); died unmarried and without issue
Duke Peter of Oldenburg (7 August 1926 – 18 November 2016); married Princess Gertrude of Löwenstein-Wertheim-Freudenberg, had issue
Duchess Eilika of Oldenburg (2 February 1928 – 26 January 2016); married Emich, 7th Prince of Leiningen, had issue
Duke Egilmar of Oldenburg (b. 14 October 1934)
Duke Friedrich August of Oldenburg (11 January 1936 - 9 July 2017); married first Princess Marie Cécile of Prussia, had issue, second Donata Countess of Castell-Rüdenhausen, no issue
Duchess Altburg of Oldenburg (b. 14 October 1938); married Baron Rüdiger of Erffa, had issue
Duke Huno of Oldenburg (b. 3 January 1940); married Countess Felicitas-Anita of Schwerin von Krosigk, had two daughters including Beatrix von Storch.
Duke Johann of Oldenburg (b. 3 January 1940); married Ilka Gräfin zu Ortenburg, had issue. His daughter Eilika married Archduke Georg of Austria

She died at the age of 48, her husband married again, two years after her death in 1950 to Anne-Marie von Schutzbar genannt Milchling.

Ancestry

Notes and sources

The Royal House of Stuart, London, 1969, 1971, 1976, Addington, A. C., Reference: II 277, 349

1899 births
1948 deaths
People from Bad Arolsen
People from the Principality of Waldeck and Pyrmont
House of Waldeck and Pyrmont
Grand Duchesses of Oldenburg
Princesses of Waldeck and Pyrmont
House of Holstein-Gottorp
Daughters of monarchs